Paul Hardin may refer to:

 Paul Hardin Jr. (1903–1996), American Methodist bishop
 Paul Hardin (chronobiologist) (born 1960), American scientist in the field of chronobiology
 Paul Hardin III (1931–2017), American academic administrator

See also
 Paul Harding (disambiguation)